York Township is one of the seventeen townships of Medina County, Ohio, United States.  The 2000 census found 2,912 people in the township.

Geography
Located in the central part of the county, it borders the following townships:
Liverpool Township - north
Brunswick Hills Township - northeast corner
Medina Township - east
Montville Township - southeast corner
Lafayette Township - south
Chatham Township - southwest corner
Litchfield Township - west
Grafton Township, Lorain County - northwest corner

Part of the city of Medina, the county seat of Medina County, is located in southeastern York Township.

Name and history
York Township was organized in 1832, and named after New York, the native state of a large share of the early settlers. It is one of ten York Townships statewide.

Government
The township is governed by a three-member board of trustees, who are elected in November of odd-numbered years to a four-year term beginning on the following January 1. Two are elected in the year after the presidential election and one is elected in the year before it. There is also an elected township fiscal officer, who serves a four-year term beginning on April 1 of the year after the election, which is held in November of the year before the presidential election. Vacancies in the fiscal officership or on the board of trustees are filled by the remaining trustees.

References

External links
Township website
County website

Townships in Medina County, Ohio
Townships in Ohio